Be quiet is a slang term meaning "shut up".

Be quiet may also refer to:

be quiet!, a German computer hardware brand
Be Quiet, a song by Pitbull
Bee Quiet, an episode from the animated cartoon Stoppit and Tidyup

See also